= Keku =

KeKu
- Website type: Private
- Headquarters: New York City, US
- Owner: Michael Choupak
- Founder: Michael Choupak (as Stanacard)
- Key people: Manlio Carrelli (CEO); Drew Bernstein (COO); Phillip Alexeev (Director of Marketing and Growth)
- Website: www.keku.com
- Launched: 10 April 2010

KeKu is a VoIP company based in New York City, in the United States. KeKu, formed in April 2010, currently offers international calling to its users by assigning local numbers to contacts in 41 countries. KeKu uses its own patented Smart Dial technology for its services. Users can make use of KeKu's services via its iOS, Android and Google Chrome apps as well as in-browser calling from keku.com.

== History ==
The parent company of KeKu, Stanacard, was formed on 20 March 2007. Stanacard's website had been launched two years earlier, in January 2005. The website provided a service for prepaid service cards with its patented Smartdial capability. KeKu was formed in April 2010. The company's website, keku.com, launched out of beta in May 2012. By August 2012, KeKu had reached 500,000 users for its free and paid services.
